Jiggs and Maggie in Jackpot Jitters is a 1949 American comedy film directed by William Beaudine and starring Joe Yule, Renie Riano and George McManus. It was the third of four films in the Jiggs and Maggie film series, spun off from Bringing Up Father (1946). The series follows the adventures of a family of Irish immigrants to the United States.

Plot
Jiggs and Maggie win a racehorse in a competition, but lose large sums of money on it each time it races.

Cast
 Joe Yule as Jiggs 
 Renie Riano as Maggie  
 George McManus as George McManus  
 Tim Ryan as Dinty Moore 
 Pat Goldin as Dugan  
 June Harrison as Nora  
 Sam Hayes as Race Announcer  
 Joe Hernandez as Race Announcer  
 Jimmy Aubrey as McGurk 
 Leon Belasco as Gambler 
 Willie Best as Willie 
 Betty Blythe as Mrs. Van Belden 
 Chester Conklin as Jiggs' Friend 
 Joe Devlin as Casey 
 Earle Hodgins as Joe Klink  
 Eddie Kane as Gambler 
 Tom Kennedy as Murphy

References

Bibliography
 Drew, Bernard A. Motion Picture Series and Sequels: A Reference Guide. Routledge, 2013.
 Marshall, Wendy L. William Beaudine: From Silents to Television. Scarecrow Press, 2005.

External links

1949 films
American comedy films
American black-and-white films
1949 comedy films
Films based on American comics
Films based on comic strips
Films directed by William Beaudine
Live-action films based on comics
Monogram Pictures films
American horse racing films
Bringing Up Father
1940s English-language films
1940s American films